The Diocese of the Armed Services and Federal Ministries in the United States is responsible for Episcopal Church chaplains and their congregations in the U.S. Department of Defense, the U.S. Department of Veterans Affairs and the Federal Bureau of Prisons.

Bishops
 Arnold Lewis (1964-1971)
 Clarence E. Hobgood (1971-1978)
 Charles L. Burgreen (1978-1989)
 Charles L. Keyser (1990-2000)
 George Elden Packard (2000-2010)
 James B. "Jay" Magness (2010–2017)
 Carl W. Wright (2017-Present)

See also
Episcopal Church Service Cross
Chaplain Corps (United States Army)
United States Air Force Chaplain Corps
United States Navy Chaplain Corps

External links
 
 Episcopal Veterans Fellowship
 Hospitallers of St. Martin

Armed Services
United States military chaplaincy
+
Religion in the United States military
Prison chaplains